Sporting Clube de Braga Feminino is a Portuguese women's football team from the city of Braga. It is the women's section of SC Braga.

Players

Current squad

Former players

Historical record

Domestic competitions

 Campeonato Nacional: 
Winners (1): 2018–19
 Taça de Portugal Feminina:
Winners (1): 2019–20
 Taça da Liga
Winners (1): 2021–22
 Supertaça de Portugal: 
Winners (1): 2018

International Competitions
 UEFA Champions League:
Last 32: 2019–20

UEFA Club Competitions record

References

External links 

 Sporting Club de Braga's website

Women's football clubs in Portugal
S.C. Braga
Sport in Braga
Campeonato Nacional de Futebol Feminino teams